Alburnus qalilus, the Syrian spotted bleak, is a species of ray-finned fish in the family Cyprinidae, that is endemic to three rivers in Syria; the Nahr al-Kabir al-Janoubi, the Nahr al-Sanawbar and the Nahr al-Hawaiz. It is threatened by pollution, water abstraction and river damming.

References

qalilus
Fish described in 1992
Endangered fish
Endemic fauna of Syria
Taxonomy articles created by Polbot